Charlie Fitzgerald Clemons (born July 4, 1972) is a former American football linebacker in the National Football League. He was signed by the St. Louis Rams as an undrafted free agent in 1997. He played college football at Georgia.

Clemons also played for the New Orleans Saints and Houston Texans. He earned a Super Bowl ring with the Rams in Super Bowl XXXIV. In the Rams 1999 season he had 44 tackles, 23 of which were on special teams. He was a free agent after the 1999 season, and in early 2000 signed a four-year $6 million deal with the Saints.

He is the uncle of Seattle Seahawks defensive end Chris Clemons and free agent Nic Clemons.

References

1972 births
Living people
American football linebackers
Georgia Bulldogs football players
St. Louis Rams players
New Orleans Saints players
Houston Texans players
Ed Block Courage Award recipients